John McMahon may refer to:

Sir John McMahon, 1st Baronet (1754–1817), British politician
John A. McMahon (1833–1923), American politician
John McMahon (Surrey and Somerset cricketer) (1917–2001), Australian-born slow left-arm bowler for Surrey and Somerset
John McMahon (Queensland cricketer) (born 1932), Australian cricketer
John McMahon (footballer, born 1949), English football player for Preston and others
John McMahon (footballer, born 1965), English football player for Darlington
John McMahon (footballer, born 1964), English football player and coach, manager of Tranmere, Shrewsbury Town and Liverpool reserves
Johnny McMahon (English footballer), footballer for Manchester City, 1902–06
John McMahon (Australian footballer, born 1900) (1900–1962), Australian footballer for Melbourne
John McMahon (Australian footballer, born 1935) (1935–2002), Australian footballer for Geelong
John McMahon (wrestler) (1841–1912), collar-and-elbow wrestler
John N. McMahon (born 1929), former Deputy Director of Central Intelligence and as Deputy Director for Operations for the CIA
Jack McMahon (1928–1989), basketball player
Johnny McMahon, Irish soccer player
John McMahon (Australian politician) (1914–1975), member of the New South Wales Legislative Assembly
John J. McMahon (bishop) (1875–1932), American prelate of the Roman Catholic Church
John McMahon (hurler) (born 1950), Irish retired hurler
John J. McMahon (architect) (1875–1958), American architect
John E. McMahon (1860–1920), U.S. Army general